Damüls-Mellau is a ski area in Vorarlberg, Austria. It is most popular for its snow safety. In 2006, the village Damüls was awarded the honorary title 'snowiest village of the world'.

Geography 
The ski area Damüls-Mellau extends at an altitude between 700 m (village Mellau) and 2,050 m (mountain station Ragazer Blanken) in the rear Bregenzerwald. The villages in and around the ski resort are Damüls (1,430 m) and Mellau ( m). 

From Mellau, a detachable 10-seater gondola lift leads up to the ski area and the Roßstelle. From Damüls, ski lifts lead directly into the ski area. About 80% of the houses in Damüls are located on the slopes or max. 100 m away of a slope. This makes Damüls popular for "ski-in ski-out".

Pistes 
In Damüls-Mellau, there are 27.6 km of easy pistes (blue), 50.5 km pistes of medium difficulty (red), 9.7 km of difficult (black) as well as 21.2 km of freeride routes.

Snow park 
The snow park consists of several snowparks, which are connected to each other (Mainpark, UGA-park, Kidspark, uga-all-MTN-line, Ragaz Pro Line). In total, the snowparks have a size of approximately 85,000 m² with approximately 2000m of freestyle slopes. There are a total of 40 freeride elements, including a halfpipe, waverides, jumps, corners and boxes.

Cross-country trails 
The ski area offers 2 cross-country trails (11 km) at an altitude between 1,500 and 1,700 m. The Unterdamüls trail is about 6 km long and hardly varies in height. The sunny cross-country trail Stofel in Oberdamüls is about 5 km long.

Tobogganing 
The toboggan run has a length of 2,5 km and is illuminated for tobogganing two nights a week.

Lift system 
The area provides 29 lifts and cable cars, one of the best snowparks in western Austria and a 120 m illuminated ski tunnel. Moreover, there are 5 practice areas with child-friendly lifts and conveyor belts.

Photo gallery

References

External links 

 Official Website of the ski area Damüls-Mellau
 Snow report of Damüls-Mellau (only available in winter)

Ski areas in Austria
Sport in Vorarlberg
Sports venues in Austria
Skiing in Austria
Vorarlberg